The Banu Bakr ibn Abd Manat were an Arabian tribe of the Hejaz region. Bani Bakr bin Abd Manat bin Kenana bin Khuzaymah bin Mdarka bin Elias bin Mudar bin Nizar bin Ma'ad bin Adnan was a subtribe of the Kenana tribes in the pre-Islamic era. The tribe converted to Islam during the Umayyad and Abbasid caliphates. It became one of the largest Arab tribes. They are the cousins of the Quraysh tribe of Prophet Muhammad. They competed with them for honor and the sovereignty of Mecca before Muhammad united all the singular tribes in the Arabian peninsula.

During Muhammad's lifetime, they were allies of the Quraish of Mecca.

In 630, their attack against Banu Khuza'a, who had recently become allies of Muhammad, violated the Treaty of Hudaybiyya of 628, which led to the conquest of Mecca by the Muslim armies, which occurred without battle.

They are distinct from the similarly named, tribe of Bakr ibn Wa'il.

Bakr bin Abdul Manat is divided into subtribes, including Banu Damrah, Banu Du’al, Banu Laith and Banu Mudlij.

Arab groups
Bakr ibn Abd Manat
Tribes of Saudi Arabia
Kinana